"She Makes Me Go" is a song by Iranian-Swedish singer, entertainer and producer Arash released as a single from his fourth studio album, Superman, which was released in November 2014. The song features Sean Paul.

It was originally released on 17 September 2012 on EMI Music Sweden. It was relaunched on 15 February 2013 in European markets including German, Austrian, French and Swiss markets on Universal Music. The song's music and arrangement is an adaptation of ICE MC's hit "Think About the Way".

Adaptation
Substantial parts of the song are taken from an earlier 1994 hit written by the Italian singer, songwriter and music producer Roberto Zanetti (aka Savage and Robyx) and performed by British hip-house / eurodance artist ICE MC entitled "Think About the Way". The ICE MC dance hit had featured Alexia on vocals. The Arash hit also borrows the hit's catch-phrase expression "Bom Digi Digi Bom" in the new release.

The earlier song had been an international hit for ICE MC (real name Ian Campbell) with top 10 appearances in Belgium, Italy and Switzerland, and top 20 showing in France, Germany, Netherlands and Sweden and made it to number 38 in the UK Top 40 charts.

In 2012, the song had also been adapted and revamped in yet another version by German dance band Groove Coverage featuring vocals from Rameez. That version had been popular in dance venues and a minor hit in Germany reaching number 54 in the German Media Control AG charts.

Music video
The music video for this single was released on 11 December 2012. Directed by Fredrik Boklund and shot in Atlanta, Georgia by Radiant3, the video shows Arash and Sean Paul in a pool-side party with a lot of girls dancing. There are also many scenes shot inside the posh house, which had earlier been shooting location for the 2009 American comedy horror film Zombieland.

Track listing
Digital download

 "She Makes Me Go (Radio)" - 2:59
 "She Makes Me Go (Mike Candys Remix)" - 4:43
 "She Makes Me Go (Extended)" - 4:35
 "She Makes Me Go (Garmiani Remix)" - 5:07

Credits and personnel
Lead vocals – Arash, Sean Paul
Producers – Arash Labaf, Robert Uhlmann
Lyrics – Arash Labaf, Robert Uhlmann, Roberto Zanetti, Sean Henriques
Label: WarnerChappell, Universal Music, EMI Music Publishing and Extravaganza Publishing

Collaborations
During the 2013 MAD Music Awards, Arash performed a live multilingual version of the song in collaboration with the Greek singer Stan with the latter singing added Greek language lyrics.

Charts

Weekly charts

Year-end charts

Certifications

Release history

References

2012 singles
Sean Paul songs
Arash (singer) songs
2012 songs
Songs written by Roberto Zanetti
Songs written by Sean Paul
EMI Records singles
Music videos directed by Fredrik Boklund